Julius Tafel (2 June 1862 – 2 September 1918) was a Swiss chemist and electrochemist.

Work
He worked first with Hermann Emil Fischer on the field of organic chemistry, but changed to electrochemistry after his work with Wilhelm Ostwald. He is known for the discovery of an electrosynthetic rearrangement reaction of various alkylated ethyl acetoacetates to form hydrocarbons, now called the Tafel rearrangement, and the Tafel equation, which relates the rate of an electrochemical reaction to the overpotential. He is also credited for the discovery of the catalytic mechanism of hydrogen evolution (the Tafel mechanism). Tafel retired aged 48 due to ill health, but continued to write book reviews until his death.

Life

Tafel suffered from insomnia and eventually had a complete nervous breakdown. He committed suicide in Munich in 1918.

References

External links

1862 births
1918 suicides
Electrochemists
Swiss chemists
Suicides in Germany
Swiss emigrants to Germany